Balasaheb Thackeray Gorewada International Zoological Park in the honour of Late Marathi leader Balasaheb Thackeray(earlier known as the Gorewada Zoo ) is a zoo in Nagpur district of Maharashtra state, India.  On commission, this is likely to be one of the largest captive Zoo Safari in India with over 1914 Hectares of land adjoining the Gorewada Lake.  The Park shall be having various features showcasing Tribal Art, Rescue Centre for Wildlife, Indian Safari, African Safari, Interpretation Centre, Trail of Senses, and Night Safari. 

The park signed MoU with TDi, which has been recognized by CZA for their contribution to wildlife and seamless crowd management, for end-to-end ticket and traffic management in 2021. 

Visitors can avail online booking through official website of Balasaheb Thackeray Gorewada International Zoological Park, Nagpur .

History
In 2006, the Government of Maharashtra  identified land of approximately forest land admeasuring 1914 Ha for establishing the project adjacent to the Gorewada Lake and at 8 km from the heart of Nagpur.  The project to create an International Standard Zoo at Gorewada, Nagpur was entrusted to the Forest Development Corporation of Maharashtra, Nagpur, Maharashtra State, India a wholly owned company of the Government of Maharashtra (Gov). The Safari Park is being developed on a Design, Build, Finance, Operate and Transfer (“DBFOT”) basis in public private partnership (“PPP”) mode.  To make the Zoo park financially viable, the State transferred additional 26 Ha Non-Forest Land for commercial utilization.

Features 
The features include a Rescue Centre for Wildlife, Indian Safari with Indian wildlife, African Safari, Interpretation Center, Night Safari. Initially, the Singapore-based Bernard Harrison and Friends were selected for preparing the master plan of the project, but was eventually not found feasible.  The designs were again made by AACS and financial feasibility by aXYKno and Tenders were floated.

Finances 
The Project has been conceived to be developed through investments from Private Developers.  The cost estimate is Rs. 392 Crores, out of which the Government of Maharashtra pools in up to Rs. 116 Crores as Viability Gap Funding, and the rest to be brought in by the Private Investor through Debt and Equity over a period of four years. Expected Project IRR is 17.62% and Equity IRR is 24.20%.

Investments on part of the FDCM 
Investment of FDCM is the Project Land, Viability Gap Funding from the Government of Maharashtra, Rescue Centre (now operational), Peripheral Compound Wall (Completed), Pre-Project activities (Indian Safari, Water Reservoir & related activities to be completed in a year's time).

Present status 
Master Plan for Zoo Safari has been approved by the Central Zoo Authority. Special Purpose Vehicle shall be formed between the Forest Development Corporation of Maharashtra (having 51% shareholding) and the JV Partner (with 49%). Selected Bidder for the Zoo Project shall be awarded adjoining 25.57 Ha Non-Forest land for development of Tourism Infrastructure Commercial activities like Hotel, Resort, Theme Park, Mall, etc. will be handed over for the period of 50 years. Bids were floated for by the FDCM for Investments, but no serious bidder came in. The FDCM has now started on its own by funding itself for the Indian Safari.  The cost estimates are likely to go upwards with the delay in execution of the project.

The Forest Advisory Committee (FAC) of the MoEFCC granted Stage II forest clearance (564 hectares).  Accordingly, a new master plan has been prepared by Gorewada consultant AACSPL-aXYKno Consultants in July 2017.  All the zoo attractions will be situated on the left side of the Katol road. This will help maintain sanctity of Gorewada lake on the right side, which supplies drinking water to the city.  As per the latest plan, Indian Safari will be in 145 hectares, followed by leopard, sloth bear, lion and tiger safari each in 25 hectare, herbivore composite safari (40 hectare), night safari (45 hectare), African safari (90 hectare), bio-park (30 hectare), bird park (7 hectare), reservoir (20 hectare), entrance plaza (16.5 hectare) among other attractions.

A Private Developer Essel was selected for development of Gorewada Zoo on PPP (Public Private Partnership).  The contract has been terminated by the Government of Maharashtra.

Chief Minister Uddhav Thackeray will open an international zoological park in Nagpur on January 26, 2021. The project is renamed as Balasaheb Thackeray Gorewada International Zoological Park

References

Zoos in Maharashtra
Tourist attractions in Nagpur
Tiger reserves of India
G 
G
Zoos
G
G